Gustaf Axel C:son Ljunggren (27 October 1894 – 12 August 1966) was a Swedish chemist.

Early life
Ljunggren was born on 27 October 1894 in Trelleborg, Sweden, the son of M.D. Carl-August Ljunggren and his wife Elise Key. He received a Bachelor of Arts degree in 1914.

Career
Ljunggren worked as an assistant at the chemical department at Lund University from 1918 to 1920. Ljunggren was a teacher of general chemistry within the medical faculty at Lund University from 1920 to 1928 and he received a Licentiate of Philosophy degree in 1921. He was chairman of the Chemical Society of Lund (Kemiska föreningen i Lund) from 1922 to 1926 and in 1925 he received a Doctor of Philosophy degree and became a lieutenant in the Swedish Coastal Artillery's reserve.

In 1925, Ljunggren worked as a docent in chemistry and from 1937 he was a professor at the Swedish Armed Forces Chemical Institute (Försvarsväsendets kemiska anstalt, FKA) (from 1945 called the Swedish National Defence Research Institute). He was chemistry teacher at the Artillery and Engineering College from 1942 and he was a member of the Research Council of the Swedish Armed Forces (Försvarets forskningsnämnd) during 1943. Ljunggren was head of the Department of Chemistry (FOA 1) at the Swedish National Defence Research Institute from 1945 from 1961 and he became a member of the Air Raid Shelter Investigation of 1948 (1948 års skyddsrumsutredning) and of the Defense Medical Board (Försvarsmedicinska nämnden) in 1947. He was chemistry teacher at the Royal Swedish Naval Staff College and the Royal Swedish Army Staff College from 1952.

Ljunggren was also a member of the Swedish Medical Society, the Swedish Chemical Society (Kemistsamfundet), the American Chemical Society, the Rotary International, and was an honorary member of Lund Academic Golf Club (Lunds akademiska golfklubb). He also wrote scientific papers on biochemistry and organic chemistry as well as investigations and writings on various military-technical research problems.

Personal life
On 24 August 1929 in Ekeby, Malm, he married Ruth Victoria Malm (born 25 July 1901), the daughter of Carl Wilhelm Malm and Amelie Cecilia Nilsson. He was the father of Margareta (born 1930) and Jan-Gustaf (born 1933).

Awards and decorations

Swedish
   Commander 1st Class of the Order of the Polar Star
   Swedish Civil Defence League Medal of Merit in gold (Sveriges civilförsvarsförbunds förtjänstmedalj i guld)
   National Aerial-Protection Association Medal of Merit in gold (Riksluftskyddsförbundets förtjänstmedalj i guld)
  National Aerial-Protection Association Medal of Merit's Badge of Merit in Gold (Riksluftskyddsförbundets förtjänsttecken i guld)

Foreign
   Commander of the Order of the Dannebrog

Honours
Member of the Royal Swedish Academy of War Sciences (1946)
Member of the Royal Swedish Academy of Engineering Sciences (1955)
Honorary Doctor of Medicine, Lund University (1958)
Corresponding member of the Royal Swedish Society of Naval Sciences (1959)
Honorary member of the Royal Swedish Academy of Engineering Sciences (1959)

References

External links
Entry at Svenskt biografiskt lexikon 

1894 births
1966 deaths
Swedish chemists
Lund University alumni
Academic staff of Lund University
Members of the Royal Swedish Academy of War Sciences
Members of the Royal Swedish Society of Naval Sciences
Members of the Royal Swedish Academy of Engineering Sciences
Fellows of the American Chemical Society
People from Trelleborg
Commanders First Class of the Order of the Polar Star
20th-century Swedish scientists
20th-century chemists